Li Lingjuan (born April 10, 1966) was first Chinese woman to win an Olympic medal in archery. She did so in her first appearance at the Olympics in Los Angeles, 1984.

External links
 profile

1966 births
Living people
Archers at the 1984 Summer Olympics
Chinese female archers
Olympic archers of China
Olympic silver medalists for China
Olympic medalists in archery
Medalists at the 1984 Summer Olympics
20th-century Chinese women